Attanagalu Oya is a river in Gampaha District, Sri Lanka.

The length of the river is approximately 76 km, with a drainage basin of 727 km2. It originates from Galapitamada area in Kegalle district and drains into the Negombo Lagoon as Dandugam Oya. The river is often a cause of floods to low-lying areas in the Gampaha district.

Hydrology 
The river originates from lower peneplains of Kegalle District in Galapitamada area. It is joined by the left tributaries Basnagoda Oya and Waharaka Oya in Karasnagala and later joined by Algama Oya further down stream close to Attanagalla town. 

Oruwal Oya and Diyaeli Oya joins the Attanagalu Oya in Gampaha.  The river then flows in a northerly direction and joined by Kimbulapitiya oya and Mapalan Oya in  Madawala (near Katunayake) and forms Dandugam Oya, Attanagalu Oya-Dandugam Oya river system then finally discharges into Negombo Lagoon in Dandugama Area where Muthurajawela meets Negombo Lagoon. Close to its mouth it is also joined by Ja-Ela which is a diversion of the Oruwal Oya.

Tributaries 
 Left
 Basnagoda Oya
 Waharaka Oya
 Oruwal Oya (sometimes referred to as Uruwal Oya)
 Ja Ela
 Right
 Algama Oya
 Diyaeli Oya
 Kimbulapitiya Oya/ Dunagaha Ela
 Mapalan Oya

References 

Bodies of water of Gampaha District
Bodies of water of Kegalle District
Rivers of Sri Lanka